Delitangu may refer to:
 Delitangu-ye Sofla